Swish (stylized as SWISH) is a compilation album by American indie rock band Joywave. It was released on March 11, 2016, through Cultco and Hollywood, primarily to promote their single "Destruction". The album contains 10 tracks, beginning with "Destruction", followed by eight versions of the song that feature different remixed intros, and ending with a bonus track titled "Life in a Bubble I Blew", a song that was cut from How Do You Feel Now?. The track titles of the portion of Swishs track list featuring the remixed versions of "Destruction" create the phrase "Why be credible when you can be incredible?". The name of the album also refers to Kanye West's seventh studio album, which was originally intended to be titled Swish.

Track listing

Singles

References

2016 albums
Joywave albums
Hollywood Records albums